Andrea Constand
Constand Viljoen